Riola Xhemaili (born 5 March 2003) is a Swiss footballer who plays as a midfielder for SC Freiburg and the Switzerland national team.

Career
Xhemaili made her debut for the Switzerland national team on 22 September 2020 against Belgium, coming on as a substitute for Ramona Bachmann.

International goals

Personal life
Xhemaili has an older sister and a twin brother, Rion. Her father and two of her uncles were also footballers. From under 11 to under 15 level, she played football in midfield alongside Rion for local club Solothurn.

References

2003 births
Living people
People from Solothurn
Swiss women's footballers
Women's association football midfielders
Switzerland women's international footballers
Swiss Women's Super League players
Frauen-Bundesliga players
FC Basel Frauen players
SC Freiburg (women) players
Swiss expatriate women's footballers
Expatriate women's footballers in Germany
Swiss expatriate sportspeople in Germany
Sportspeople from the canton of Solothurn
UEFA Women's Euro 2022 players